Laura Jansen (born 4 March 1977) is a Dutch-American musician. Before gaining fame in the Netherlands, Jansen became a fixture in the constellation of artists associated with Los Angeles nightclub Hotel Café – a national launching pad for artists as Sara Bareilles, Priscilla Ahn and Joshua Radin. As a daughter of an American mother and Dutch father, Laura has been living in the United States for over 10 years.

Jansen's debut album Bells, a dreamy collection of piano-driven alt-pop songs, was released on Universal Music in the Netherlands in 2009, on Decca Records in the USA in March 2011 and in the rest of the world in May 2011 on Universal Music Group. 
Bells has gone platinum in Jansen's native country the Netherlands, reached a No. 1 position on iTunes and a No. 6 position in the Dutch Album Top 100. Propelled by Single Girls and a cover of Kings of Leon's Use Somebody, which has spent more than 6 months lodged in the Top 25 on the Dutch singles chart.

Early life
Born in Breda, to a Dutch father and an American mother, Jansen began playing piano at age five while the family lived in Brussels, followed by Zurich and Connecticut. Jansen fell in love with classical music, Queen, Joni Mitchell, Barbra Streisand, and the Brazilian protest music her mother loved. In high school, she sang in the choir and performed in musicals.

Passionate about politics, Jansen worked at the U.N. in Geneva and studied political science in college but backed away after a good friend, a human-rights activist, was killed in Africa.

Jansen spent two years at a music conservatory in the Netherlands, before transferring to Boston's renowned Berklee College of Music with a scholarship. After graduating, she moved to Nashville to become a songwriter.

Hotel Café
Jansen packed up to Los Angeles in 2003. Jansen's first call was to Hotel Café, where she became a part of this community – home to Sara Bareilles, John Mayer, Katy Perry and many more singer/songwriters.

On 26 February 2007 she released her Trauma EP, from which she licensed songs to MTV's The Real World and Newport Harbor, and she had a song covered on Canadian Idol.

In summer 2008, Laura performed as both a member of Joshua Radin's band and as an opener on his sold-out headlining tour. She made her first TV appearance with Radin on Last Call with Carson Daly and performed alongside Radin as the only two musical performers at Ellen DeGeneres' wedding.

Soon after, Laura was offered a slot on the Hotel Café All Girls' Tour in the Fall alongside Ingrid Michaelson, Rachael Yamagata, and Erin McCarley. Upon returning from the SXSW Music Festival, Laura finished her second EP Single Girls, released on 26 June 2009, a collection of five alternative, intimate pop songs. It debuted at No. 25 on the U.S. iTunes Pop Charts.

Europe
Upon her return, Laura was invited to the Netherlands for a series of performances, most importantly at the television show De Wereld Draait Door. In a week she was signed to Universal Music Netherlands where her full-length record entitled Bells (a compilation of Jansen's two previously released EPs: 2007's Trauma and 2009's Single Girls, plus Use Somebody) was released on 6 September 2009.

In a short amount of time Laura completed two sold-out national club tours and received a certified gold record. Her album stayed lodged in the Dutch Album Charts for over 60 weeks and reached a No. 1 position on iTunes. Bells sold over 50.000 copies in the Netherlands and reached platinum status in 2011.

Jansen toured Europe in the fall of 2009 with William Fitzsimmons, both as a member of his band and as his support act. She continued to play in Germany, Austria, the UK and the Czech Republic as fans spread the word.

Laura also appeared as a special guest vocalist on stage in Amsterdam with Snow Patrol as well as Novastar. In 2010 she was a featured artist at Germany's showcase festivals Popkomm and Reeperbahn Festival as well as the SXSW Music Festival 2010.

In 2011 Laura continued to tour, visiting the Netherlands, Germany, Austria and Switzerland again. Jansen also toured with Belgium singer-songwriter Milow as his support act and a member of his band in August 2011 in Germany.

United States
After returning from touring in Europe in the beginning of 2011, Jansen hit the road again with Joshua Radin in February 2011 as both a member of his band and as an opener on his headlining tour through the US and Canada.

Following her album release of debut album Bells in the US on 22 March 2011 Jansen went on the road with her own headline tour with shows in New York, Chicago and Los Angeles and several performances on the SXSW Music Festival 2011, most importantly with a showcase at the Hotel Café Showcase.

In October 2011 Laura Jansen also performed on The Late Late Show with Craig Ferguson with her song "Wicked World".

China
In November 2011 Jansen made her way to China, invited by Shanghai and Beijing-based promoters Split Works.

When she started a Douban group (Chinese Facebook) in the beginning of 2011, Jansen immediately shot to number No. 1 artist and stayed there for several weeks. In a short amount of time, she gained hundreds of thousands of listeners across the Chinese internet. Jansen toured China in November 2011, including sold out shows in Nanjing and Shanghai. In November 2011 Laura's debut album Bells was officially released in China.

In May 2012 Jansen was invited back to China to perform at the Chinese Strawberry Music Festival in Beijing and Shanghai.

Live band
In the early 2010s, Jansen's live band consisted of the Dutch musicians Jan-Peter Hoekstra (guitars, vocals), Wouter Rentema (drums, percussion, vocals), and Jan Teertstra (bass, vocals).

Discography

Albums and EPs
In the US, Laura Jansen has two self-released EPs, Trauma, (released 26 February 2007) and Single Girls (released 26 June 2009). 22 March 2011 her debut album Bells was released in the U.S.

Jansen's debut album Bells was released on Universal Music in the Netherlands in 2009, on Decca Records in the US in March 2011 and in the rest of the world in May 2011 on Universal Music Group.

Debut album Bells (composed of Jansen's two previously released EPs 2007's Trauma and 2009's Single Girls, plus cover Use Somebody) went platinum in Jansen's native Netherlands, reached a No. 1 position on iTunes and a No. 6 position in the Dutch Album Top 100.

Laura Jansen released her album Elba in 2013. It featured the singles "Same Heart" and "Queen of Elba". The latter gained critical acclaim and was described as "sublime".

Singles
Jansen has released three songs from her album Bells as singles. "Single Girls" peaked at number 70 on the Dutch Single Top 100. The second single was "Use Somebody", originally by Kings of Leon. The song peaked at number 8 on the Dutch Single Top 100 and spent more than 6 months lodged in the Top 25 on the Dutch singles chart. The third single from this album, "Wicked World", which was also the theme song for the Dutch comedy series "Floor Faber", peaked at number 31 on the Dutch Single Top 100.

Jansen's second single "Use Somebody", was remixed by Armin van Buuren and is played frequently in his shows.

In December 2012 the charity single "Same Heart", featuring Tom Chaplin, was released. All proceeds generated from sales of "Same Heart" will be fully granted to the 3FM Serious Request campaign 2012.

Other
Jansen's music has been featured on various television shows on MTV and ABC like Newport Harbor, The Real World: Cancun, Canadian Idol, MTV Awkward and on a spot for Weeds.

Laura Jansen appears in the music video for Sara Bareilles' song "Uncharted".

Laura Jansen duets with David Hopkins on the song "Dublin".

Chart positions
Taken from dutchcharts.nl.

Albums

|-
|align="left"|Trauma||26 February 2007||-||||||EP
|-
|align="left"|Single Girls||26 June 2009||-||||||EP
|-
|align="left"|Bells||4 September 2009||12 September 2009||6||95||Platinum
|-
|align="left"|Elba||22 March 2013||30 March 2013||5||24||
|-
|align="left"|We Saw a Light||7 May 2021||15 May 2021||45||||
|}

Singles

|-
|align="left"|"Single Girls"||26 June 2009||12 September 2009||70||9||Single Top 100
|-
|align="left"|"Use Somebody"||16 October 2009||28 November 2009||8||62||Single Top 100 
|-
|align="left"|"Wicked World"||12 March 2010||10 April 2010||31||14||Single Top 100 
|-
|align="left"|"Same Heart" (feat. Tom Chaplin)||4 December 2012||8 December 2012||6||6||Single Top 100
|}

References

External links
 Official website
 YouTube

1977 births
Living people
American women singer-songwriters
American pop pianists
American women pianists
American people of Dutch descent
Dutch women singers
Dutch singer-songwriters
Dutch pop pianists
Dutch women pianists
Dutch people of American descent
People from Breda
American women pop singers
21st-century American women singers
21st-century Dutch singers
21st-century American pianists
21st-century American singers
American singer-songwriters
Codarts University for the Arts alumni